Tell It Like It Is is the seventh studio album by American country music artist Billy Joe Royal. It was released on January 31, 1989 via Atlantic Records. The album peaked at number 15 on the Billboard Top Country Albums chart.

Track listing

Charts

Weekly charts

Year-end charts

References

1989 albums
Billy Joe Royal albums
Atlantic Records albums